Samuel Isaac Michael King (born 12 January 2003) is an English cricketer He made his List A debut on 8 August 2021, for Nottinghamshire in the 2021 Royal London One-Day Cup, as a concussion replacement for Lyndon James.

References

External links
 

2003 births
Living people
English cricketers
Nottinghamshire cricketers
Cricketers from Nottingham